Ana Kirby (born August 14, 1974), known by her stage name Ana Matronic, is an American singer, best known as the female co-lead singer for the pop rock band Scissor Sisters.

Career 
She joined Scissor Sisters, founded by Jake Shears and Babydaddy, after they played their first live gig at club Knockoff on the Lower East Side of Manhattan.

She has stated that, in her eyes, the objective of the band is "about people displaying their fantasies on the outside, trying to break out of the everyday, and look like their dreams." In The Scissorhood, the fan community for Scissor Sisters, those fans who hold a special affinity for Ana are known as "nuns". Fans who are attracted to Ana, even if they might not usually be attracted to women, term themselves "Anasexual".

In 2005, she was featured on the New Order single "Jetstream", taken from the band's album Waiting for the Sirens' Call. In 2009, Matronic performed on the glass harmonica at the New Museum in NYC in Auroville, a multimedia ritual tribute to an experimental community dedicated to the guru Sri Aurobindo. Ana appears as a guest vocalist on the Mark Ronson-produced track "Safe (In the Heat of the Moment)" from the December 21, 2010, release All You Need Is Now from the band Duran Duran.

In 2012, Matronic appeared as an advisor on The Voice UK, pairing up to assist Jessie J. The following year, she served as commentator of the BBC Three broadcast of the Eurovision Song Contest 2013 semi-finals in Malmö, Sweden, for the United Kingdom, replacing Sara Cox. Matronic returned in 2014 as radio commentator on Radio 2 Eurovision, a pop-up DAB station, for the second semi-final of the Eurovision Song Contest 2014 in Copenhagen, Denmark.

Matronic appeared on Strictly Come Dancing: It Takes Two on November 15, 2013, alongside Jason Donovan and Jodie Prenger.

She presented a weekly show on BBC Radio 2 from 00:00 to 02:00 on Sunday overnights. The show was titled Disco Devotion from April 2017, before changing its name to Dance Devotion. In 2022, she announced she will be leaving the station due to changes of the weekend schedule; the final edition of Dance Devotion aired on June 19. The final show contained 'anything with a repetitive beat', songs of which include Deep Inside by Hardrive, You Got The Love by Candi Staton, and Professional Widow by Tori Amos and Armand van Helden.

From July 24–27, 2017, she covered for Jo Whiley and presented a special programme alongside Scott Mills on July 29 celebrating the 50th anniversary of the decriminalisation of male homosexual activity in the UK.

She performed a live DJ set at Radio 2 Live in Hyde Park on September 10, 2018, and has hosted a New Year's Eve 2018 show for the channel.

Matronic covers when BBC Radio 2 regular presenters are on holiday.

Personal life 
Her punning stage name is said to be due to "a deep and abiding love of robots". In 2015, she penned a book entitled Robot Universe: Legendary Automatons and Androids from the Ancient World to the Distant Future; published by Sterling New York. She has a large tattoo on her right shoulder of bionic circuitry. She has a second tattoo on her ankle of a Celtic knot to signify her Irish roots.

Matronic married her long-time boyfriend and fiancé Seth Kirby in April 2010 at New York City Hall after they had been together for seven years. She has had relationships with women, but stated in a 2013 interview with Diva she "[doesn't] like identifying as gay or straight or even bisexual" but rather as "a human being", saying "I believe in human rights. We should treat each other exactly the same whoever we are. The rigid constructs put into place to define us don't really work."

Matronic is patron of UK charity Beyond Reflections, which supports transgender people. In January 2019 she appeared on the BBC TV show Mastermind with Beyond Reflections (then known as Chrysalis) as her chosen charity.

References

External links 

1974 births
Living people
21st-century American women singers
American expatriates in England
American people of Irish descent
American women pop singers
American women rock singers
American women in electronic music
BBC Radio 2 presenters
Musicians from Portland, Oregon
Scissor Sisters members
American women radio presenters
21st-century American singers
American LGBT singers